In enzymology, a bilirubin oxidase, BOD or BOx, is an enzyme encoded by a gene in various organisms that catalyzes the chemical reaction

2 bilirubin + O2  2 biliverdin + 2 H2O

This enzyme belongs to the family of oxidoreductases, to be specific those acting on the CH-CH group of donor with oxygen as acceptor.  The systematic name of this enzyme class is bilirubin:oxygen oxidoreductase. This enzyme is also called bilirubin oxidase M-1.  This enzyme participates in porphyrin and chlorophyll metabolism.  It is widely studied as a catalyst for oxygen reduction.

Two structures of bilirubin oxidase from the ascomycete Myrothecium verrucaria have been deposited in the Protein Data Bank (accession codes  and ).

The active site consists of four copper centers, reminiscent of laccase.  These centers are classified as type I (cys, met, his, his), type II (3his), and two type III (2his).

Further reading

References 

 

EC 1.3.3
Copper enzymes